Harry Fraser may refer to:

Harold Fraser (cricketer) (1915–1993), Guyanese cricketer
Harold Fraser (golfer) (1872–1945), American golfer
Harold Fraser (weightlifter) (born 1937), South African weightlifter
Harry Pollard (1889–1962), born Harold Fraser, best known as Snub Pollard, Australian-born silent movie comedian, popular in the 1920s
Harold John Fraser (1893–1975), lawyer and politician in Saskatchewan, Canada
Harold Livingstone Fraser (1890–1950), Australian aviator
Harold Fraser-Simson (1872–1944), English composer

See also
Harry Fraser (disambiguation)